Kipruto is a surname of Kenyan origin meaning "one who likes travelling" or "one who was born on a travel/journey." Notable people with the name include:

Amos Kipruto (born 1992), Kenyan long-distance runner
Asbel Kipruto Kiprop (born 1989), Kenyan middle-distance runner and 2008 Olympic champion
Ben Chebet Kipruto (born 1982), Kenyan marathon runner based in Italy
Benson Kipruto (born 1991), Kenyan long-distance runner
Brimin Kipruto (born 1985), Kenyan steeplechase athlete and 2008 Olympic champion
Conseslus Kipruto (born 1994) Kenyan steeplechase runner, 2012 World youth champion
Gilbert Kipruto Kirwa (born 1985), Kenyan runner and winner of the 2009 Vienna and Frankfurt marathons
Mike Kipruto Kigen (born 1986), Kenyan long-distance track runner
Silas Kipruto (born 1984), Kenyan 5000 metres and half marathon runner
Vincent Kipruto (born 1987), Kenyan marathon runner

See also
 Kalenjin name
 Ruto, a Kalenjin surname of Kenya

Surnames of Kenyan origin
Kalenjin names